The Caudron C.440 Goéland ("seagull") was a six-seat twin-engine utility aircraft developed in France in the mid-1930s.

Design and development
It was a conventionally configured low-wing cantilever monoplane with tailwheel undercarriage.  The main undercarriage units retracted into the engine nacelles.  Construction was wooden throughout, with wooden skinning everywhere but the forward and upper fuselage sections, which were skinned in metal.  As usually configured, the cabin seated six passengers with baggage compartments fore and aft, and a toilet aft.

Operational history

Apart from private buyers, the C.440 was also bought by the Armée de l'Air, Aéronavale, Aéromaritime, Régie Air Afrique and Air France, and some were exported for service with Aeroput. Production of the C.440 and its subtypes continued until the outbreak of World War II, at which time many C.440s were impressed into military service.  Following the fall of France, some were operated by the German Luftwaffe and Deutsche Luft Hansa. Another user was the Slovenské vzdušné zbrane - it ordered 12 aircraft as the C.445M in 1942.

Production began again after the war for military and civil use as a transport and as a twin-engined trainer. In the postwar reorganisation of the French aircraft industry, Caudron became part of SNCA du Nord and the aircraft became the Nord Goeland; 325 of these were built. Postwar commercial operators included Air France, SABENA, Aigle Azur and Compagnie Air Transport (CAT).

Variants
 C.440 - prototype (three built)
 C.441 - version with Renault 6Q-01 engine and dihedral added to outer wing panel (four built)
 C.444 - first version with counter-rotating propellers, adopted on all later versions (17 built)
 C.445 - similar to C.444, but dihedral of outer wing panels increased (114 built)
 C.445/1 - two built
 C.445/2 - three built
 C.445/3 - postwar production version (510 built)
 C.445M - militarised version (404 built)
 C.445R - long-range version (one built)
 C.446 Super Goéland - one built
 C.447 - air ambulance version (31 built)
 C.448 - version with supercharged engines (seven built)
 C.449 - final production version (349 built, including subtypes below)
 C.449/1
 C.449/2
 C.449/3
 C.449/4 - photographic survey version
 C.449/5

Operators

Belgian Air Force
SABENA

Bulgarian Air Force

Air Bleu
Aéromaritime
Aeronavale
Aigle Azur
Air France
Armee de l'Air
Chargeurs Réunis
 (CAT)
Règie Air Afrique

Deutsche Luft Hansa
Luftwaffe

LAPE

Aeroput
Royal Yugoslav Air Force - One aircraft was impressed into military in April 1940.

Slovenské vzdušné zbrane

LAPE
Spanish Republican Air Force

Specifications (C.445M)

See also

References

Citations

Bibliography

 
 
 

1930s French civil utility aircraft
C.440
Low-wing aircraft
Aircraft first flown in 1934
Twin piston-engined tractor aircraft